Ctenoides scaber, the flame scallop or rough fileclam, is a species of saltwater clam, a marine bivalve mollusc in the family Limidae. Despite their common name, flame scallops are not closely related to true scallops.

This species is found in the Caribbean Sea. It is similar in appearance to the Indo-Pacific electric flame scallop (Ctenoides ales).

Description 
Flame scallops have a rough shell and a red mantle. At the edge of the mantle are red and white tentacles. The flame scallop's vibrant red color is due to the large amount of carotenoids found within their body. Flame scallops can reach 3 inches in length. As is the case in almost all bivalves, the gills in this species are used both for respiration and filtration.

Habitat and diet 
Flame scallops rest in their own "nests", which are made of small coral pieces and rocks.  Flame scallops are herbivorous, eating only phytoplankton. During the consumption process, flame scallops sift and sort through the phytoplankton with their palps to determine what is appropriate for ingestion.

Predators 
To escape predators such as crabs and shrimp, the flame scallop's valves are utilized in fast locomotion, clapping their valves together to propel themselves away.

References 

 Turgeon, D. D., W. G. Lyons, P. Mikkelsen, G. Rosenberg, and F. Moretzsohn. 2009. Bivalvia (Mollusca) of the Gulf of Mexico, Pp. 711–744 in Felder, D.L. and D.K. Camp (eds.), Gulf of Mexico–Origins, Waters, and Biota. Biodiversity. Texas A&M Press, College

External links
  Born, I. Von. (1778). Index rerum naturalium Musei Cæsarei Vindobonensis. Pars I.ma. Testacea. Verzeichniß der natürlichen Seltenheiten des k. k. Naturalien Cabinets zu Wien. Erster Theil. Schalthiere.
 Gmelin J.F. (1791). Vermes. In: Gmelin J.F. (Ed.) Caroli a Linnaei Systema Naturae per Regna Tria Naturae, Ed. 13. Tome 1(6). G.E. Beer, Lipsiae [Leipzig. pp. 3021-3910]

Limidae
Taxa named by Ignaz von Born